The Chitrakootdham (Karwi)–Kanpur Intercity Express (via Allahabad) is an Indian Railways Super fast train which runs between the cities of Kanpur and Chitrakoot Dham (Karwi). It is the much awaited train of North Central Railway, with 14 coaches.

History
The train was flagged off on 01-09-2012 by Union Coal Minister Shri Prakash Jaiswal from Kanpur Central. After sometime it was extended up to Chitrakootdham (Karwi) on 25 February 2018.

Service

Routing

See also
 Kanpur Central
 Shram Shakti Express
 Kanpur New Delhi Shatabdi Express
 Kanpur
 Lucknow-Kanpur Suburban Railway

References

Trains from Kanpur
Chitrakootdham
Railway services introduced in 2012
Chitrakoot district